The Avodah is an essential part of the Mussaf service of Yom Kippur, based upon the detailed account given in the Mishnah Yoma of the sacrificial service performed by the High Priest in the Temple at Jerusalem.

Background
The basis for this elaborate function is found in Leviticus 16. Originally this part of the service seems to have consisted only in the recital of the Mishnah treatise, Yoma. Gradually it was further elaborated, and became the most solemn and impressive portion of the Yom Kippur service.

The Avodah usually begins with a prayer for the synagogue reader, followed by a cursory review of the Biblical history from Adam down to Aaron. Then the whole Temple service is minutely described: the preparation of the High Priest during seven days preceding the festival, the appointment of a substitute to meet the emergency of the High Priest's becoming disqualified, the preparation of the holy vessels, the offering of the regular morning sacrifice, the baths and ablutions of the High Priest, his different changes of garments, and the scapegoat ritual.

The prayer of the High Priest after the completion of the service is then recited. Now follows a glowing description—after the Book of Sirach—of the beauty of the appearance of the High Priest, and those are pronounced happy who had seen all the old glory, while the misfortune is deplored of the living who are deprived of Temple, altar, and Priest, and have constantly to submit to new and intolerable sufferings. The service closes with ardent prayers for the re-establishment of the Temple service.

Music
Among the northern Jews it was the function of the ḥazan not merely to lead the liturgical song of the congregation, but rather, by his singing, to interpret and elucidate the liturgy to the congregation. Even in medieval times the cantors were inspired by a subconscious sentiment of this kind, to voice in the Avodah all of Israel's longing for rest and liberty; and at times they would approach to the expression of sublimest emotion. Whenever the contrast between the servitude they knew and the glory they read of was more than usually keen, a particular intensity was lent to the Atonement liturgy; and there developed, probably before the modern period, a rhapsody replete with inarticulate vocalization. These main lines remained distinct under the growth of improvised cadences.

Compositions of the modern masters have largely taken the place of the old plain-song chant, itself mainly a rising modulation and then a falling tone.

But the Talmudic passage commencing  ("Now the priests"), which occurs after each confession, and describes the scene when the Tetragrammaton was pronounced, reverses this order. It is first uttered by the congregation (usually led by some individual), who prostrate themselves when reciting the words describing that action. Then comes the turn of the ḥazan, who intones the passage. In this transcription the opportunity is afforded by the repetition of the melody to present both the chief forms of ornamental development, the first being rather German, the other rather Polish, in tradition. The cantor commences calmly to intone the words of the Mishnah in the major mode, but when describing the mystic solemnity of the scene in the Temple court, he breaks away into the strenuousness of the Oriental chromatic scale at the thought of the Divine Presence. He attempts a return to the calmness of the original key, but the thoughts conjured up by the words again overwhelm his intention, and drive him on to an ecstatic climax.

External links
 Interpretation of the Avoda tune by Ernest Bloch

References
  
  

Yom Kippur
Mussaf